Hosta is a settlement on the right bank of the Sora River in the Municipality of Škofja Loka in the Upper Carniola region of Slovenia.

Name
The name Hosta comes from the dialect word hosta 'woods, forest'. This name and variants of it (Host, Hostec, etc.) are common in Slovenia, referring to various toponyms and microtoponyms.

References

External links 

Hosta at Geopedia

Populated places in the Municipality of Škofja Loka